The men's competition in 94 kg division was staged on September 22–23, 2007.

Schedule

Medalists

Records

Results

References
Results 

Men's 94